Ümraniye is a district of Istanbul. It was separated from Üsküdar in 1987. It is bordered by Çekmeköy to the northeast, Sancaktepe to the east, Ataşehir to the south, Üsküdar to the west and Beykoz to the northwest.

History
Ümraniye is located on high ground just inland from Üsküdar. It was originally a small village of less than 900 inhabitants, mainly coming from the Black Sea Region in the 1950s. Its population grew far beyond its capacity during the 1970s and 1980s due to migration to the cities from rural areas of Anatolia. On 17 March 1978, 5 workers were massacred by Communist militants in the district.

The growth of Ümraniye was relatively better controlled than other districts that also attracted workers on the European side (such as Esenler or Gaziosmanpaşa); there are wider roads through the district, more space between the blocks and relatively more green space. A large commercial district grew up to support this large population. The main road through the centre has public buildings, shops, shopping centres and branches of many banks.

Ümraniye today

In the last few decades, Ümraniye has built a lively shopping and business district. Recent building projects include the construction of large shopping malls (including Istanbul's first branch of IKEA), and modern apartment complexes have made parts of Ümraniye attractive places buying real estate, as Ümraniye is on a main highway that leads to one of the two bridges linking the Asian and European sides of Istanbul.

Sports
The women's football club Dudullu Spor  was promoted to the Women's First League for the 2020-21 League season.

Politics
Ümraniye has seen its fair share of political violence between left and right-wingers over the years, and during the 70s and 80s law enforcement was problematic in parts of the area. In this way it was considered the Asian side's equivalent of Gaziosmanpaşa on the European side. This violence was concentrated in a small quarter of Ümraniye, a vast district. In recent times however, Ümraniye has been relatively calm. The people of Ümraniye usually vote in large numbers for conservative parties. The AK Party does well in this district.

Climate 
Ümraniye experiences a relatively cool Mediterranean climate (Csa/Cs) according to both Köppen and Trewartha climate classifications, barely missing the criteria for a humid subtropical climate (Cfa/Cf), with cool winters and warm to hot summers. Because of its altitude, it is one of the colder districts of Istanbul, with plentiful snowfall and a reputation as a cold, brisk location. It falls into USDA hardiness zone 8b, and AHS heat zone 3.

Places of importance

In between Üsküdar and Ümraniye there is a 'çilehane' of the Sufi saint Aziz Mahmud Hudayi. A çilehane (lit. 'house of despair') was where Sufis would go to pray in seclusion.

The Haldun Alagaş Sports Hall is located here, which is named after the karateka Haldun Alagaş. The venue hosts both national and international basketball, volleyball, handball games and martial art competitions.

Due to its elevated altitude, the full scene of Istanbul, including Bosphorus and European Side, can be seen from Ümraniye.

References

External links

 Ümraniye municipality web site

 
Populated places in Istanbul Province
Districts of Istanbul Province